Lemolang (also called Limola) is an Austronesian language of Sulawesi, Indonesia. It is spoken in two villages in North Luwu Regency, South Sulawesi.

References

Languages of Sulawesi
South Sulawesi languages